"Heaven's Not for Saints (Let It Go)" is a song by Morten Harket, released as a non-album single in 1996.

The single was released in the UK and Norway only and was Harket's first release on the record label BMG Arista. It reached number 9 on the Norwegian charts.

It was performed as the opening act for Eurovision 1996, which Harket hosted with Ingvild Bryn.

References

1996 songs
1996 singles
Morten Harket songs
Songs written by Morten Harket